Al Wefaq or Al Wifaq may refer to:
Al Wefaq, Bahraini political party
Al Wifaq (organization), Moroccan Jewish nationalist organization
Al Wifaq (newspaper), Sudanese newspaper